In mathematics, the concept of a measure is a generalization and formalization of geometrical measures (length, area, volume) and other common notions, such as mass and probability of events. These seemingly distinct concepts have many similarities and can often be treated together in a single mathematical context. Measures are foundational in probability theory, integration theory, and can be generalized to assume negative values, as with electrical charge. Far-reaching  generalizations (such as spectral measures and projection-valued measures) of measure are widely used in quantum physics and physics in general.

The intuition behind this concept dates back to ancient Greece, when Archimedes tried to calculate the area of a circle. But it was not until the late 19th and early 20th centuries that measure theory became a branch of mathematics. The foundations of modern measure theory were laid in the works of Émile Borel, Henri Lebesgue, Nikolai Luzin, Johann Radon, Constantin Carathéodory, and Maurice Fréchet, among others.

Definition

Non-negativity: For all  in  we have 
Null empty set: 
Countable additivity (or -additivity): For all countable collections  of pairwise disjoint sets in Σ,

If at least one set  has finite measure, then the requirement  is met automatically due to countable additivity:

and therefore 

If the condition of non-negativity is dropped, and  takes on at most one of the values of  then  is called a signed measure.

A triple  is called a measure space. A probability measure is a measure with total measure one – that is,  A probability space is a measure space with a probability measure.

For measure spaces that are also topological spaces various compatibility conditions can be placed for the measure and the topology. Most measures met in practice in analysis (and in many cases also in probability theory) are Radon measures. Radon measures have an alternative definition in terms of linear functionals on the locally convex topological vector space of continuous functions with compact support. This approach is taken by Bourbaki (2004) and a number of other sources. For more details, see the article on Radon measures.

Instances

Some important measures are listed here.

 The counting measure is defined by  = number of elements in 
 Circular angle measure is invariant under rotation, and hyperbolic angle measure is invariant under squeeze mapping.
 The Haar measure for a locally compact topological group is a generalization of the Lebesgue measure (and also of counting measure and circular angle measure) and has similar uniqueness properties.
 The Hausdorff measure is a generalization of the Lebesgue measure to sets with non-integer dimension, in particular, fractal sets.
 Every probability space gives rise to a measure which takes the value 1 on the whole space (and therefore takes all its values in the unit interval [0, 1]). Such a measure is called a probability measure. See probability axioms.
 The Dirac measure δa (cf. Dirac delta function) is given by δa(S) = χS(a), where χS is the indicator function of  The measure of a set is 1 if it contains the point  and 0 otherwise.

Other 'named' measures used in various theories include: Borel measure, Jordan measure, ergodic measure, Gaussian measure, Baire measure, Radon measure, Young measure, and Loeb measure.
 
In physics an example of a measure is spatial distribution of mass (see for example, gravity potential), or another non-negative extensive property, conserved (see conservation law for a list of these) or not. Negative values lead to signed measures, see "generalizations" below.

 Liouville measure, known also as the natural volume form on a symplectic manifold, is useful in classical statistical and Hamiltonian mechanics.
 Gibbs measure is widely used in statistical mechanics, often under the name canonical ensemble.

Basic properties
Let  be a measure.

Monotonicity

Measure of countable unions and intersections

Subadditivity
For any countable sequence  of (not necessarily disjoint) measurable sets  in

Continuity from below
If  are measurable sets that are increasing (meaning that ) then the union of the sets  is measurable and

Continuity from above
If  are measurable sets that are decreasing (meaning that ) then the intersection of the sets  is measurable; furthermore, if at least one of the  has finite measure then

This property is false without the assumption that at least one of the  has finite measure. For instance, for each  let  which all have infinite Lebesgue measure, but the intersection is empty.

Other properties

Completeness

A measurable set  is called a null set if  A subset of a null set is called a negligible set. A negligible set need not be measurable, but every measurable negligible set is automatically a null set. A measure is called complete if every negligible set is measurable.

One defines  to equal

μ{x : f(x) ≥ t} = μ{x : f(x) > t} (a.e.)
If  is -measurable, then

for almost all  This property is used in connection with Lebesgue integral.

Additivity
Measures are required to be countably additive. However, the condition can be strengthened as follows.
For any set  and any set of nonnegative  define:

Note that the second condition is equivalent to the statement that the ideal of null sets is -complete.

Sigma-finite measures

A measure space  is called finite if  is a finite real number (rather than ). Nonzero finite measures are analogous to probability measures in the sense that any finite measure  is proportional to the probability measure  A measure  is called σ-finite if  can be decomposed into a countable union of measurable sets of finite measure. Analogously, a set in a measure space is said to have a σ-finite measure if it is a countable union of sets with finite measure.

For example, the real numbers with the standard Lebesgue measure are σ-finite but not finite. Consider the closed intervals  for all integers  there are countably many such intervals, each has measure 1, and their union is the entire real line. Alternatively, consider the real numbers with the counting measure, which assigns to each finite set of reals the number of points in the set. This measure space is not σ-finite, because every set with finite measure contains only finitely many points, and it would take uncountably many such sets to cover the entire real line. The σ-finite measure spaces have some very convenient properties; σ-finiteness can be compared in this respect to the Lindelöf property of topological spaces. They can be also thought of as a vague generalization of the idea that a measure space may have 'uncountable measure'.

Strictly localizable measures

Semifinite measures

Semifinite measures generalize sigma-finite measures, in such a way that some big theorems of measure theory that hold for sigma-finite but not arbitrary measures can be extended with little modification to hold for semifinite measures. (To-do: add examples of such theorems; cf. the talk page.)

Basic examples
 Every sigma-finite measure is semifinite.
 Assume  let  and assume  for all 
We have that  is semifinite if and only if  for all 
 sigma-finite if and only if  is countable; and
 semifinite (without regard to whether  is countable). (Thus, counting measure, on the power set  of an arbitrary uncountable set  gives an example of a semifinite measure that is not sigma-finite.)

Involved example
The zero measure is sigma-finite and thus semifinite. In addition, the zero measure is clearly less than or equal to  It can be shown there is a greatest measure with these two properties:

We give some nice, explicit formulas, which some authors may take as definition, for the semifinite part:
 
 
 

Since  is semifinite, it follows that if  then  is semifinite. It is also evident that if  is semifinite then

Non-examples
Every  measure that is not the zero measure is not semifinite. (Here, we say  measure to mean a measure whose range lies in) Below we give examples of  measures that are not zero measures.
 Let  be nonempty, let  be a -algebra on  let  be not the zero function, and let  It can be shown that  is a measure.
 
   

Involved non-example

Here is an explicit formula for :

Results regarding semifinite measures

Localizable measures
Localizable measures are a special case of semifinite measures and a generalization of sigma-finite measures.

s-finite measures

A measure is said to be s-finite if it is a countable sum of bounded measures. S-finite measures are more general than sigma-finite ones and have applications in the theory of stochastic processes.

Non-measurable sets

If the axiom of choice is assumed to be true, it can be proved that not all subsets of Euclidean space are Lebesgue measurable; examples of such sets include the Vitali set, and the non-measurable sets postulated by the Hausdorff paradox and the Banach–Tarski paradox.

Generalizations
For certain purposes, it is useful to have a "measure" whose values are not restricted to the non-negative reals or infinity. For instance, a countably additive set function with values in the (signed) real numbers is called a signed measure, while such a function with values in the complex numbers is called a complex measure. Observe, however, that complex measure is necessarily of finite variation, hence complex measures include finite signed measures but not, for example, the Lebesgue measure.

Measures that take values in Banach spaces have been studied extensively. A measure that takes values in the set of self-adjoint projections on a Hilbert space is called a projection-valued measure; these are used in functional analysis for the spectral theorem. When it is necessary to distinguish the usual measures which take non-negative values from generalizations, the term positive measure is used. Positive measures are closed under conical combination but not general linear combination, while signed measures are the linear closure of positive measures.

Another generalization is the finitely additive measure, also known as a content. This is the same as a measure except that instead of requiring countable additivity we require only finite additivity. Historically, this definition was used first. All these are linked in one way or another to the axiom of choice. Contents remain useful in certain technical problems in geometric measure theory; this is the theory of Banach measures.

A charge is a generalization in both directions: it is a finitely additive, signed measure. (Cf. ba space for information about bounded charges, where we say a charge is bounded to mean its range its a bounded subset of R.)

See also

 Abelian von Neumann algebra
 Almost everywhere
 Carathéodory's extension theorem
 Content (measure theory)
 Fubini's theorem
 Fatou's lemma
 Fuzzy measure theory
 Geometric measure theory
 Hausdorff measure
 Inner measure
 Lebesgue integration
 Lebesgue measure
 Lorentz space
 Lifting theory
 Measurable cardinal
 Measurable function
 Minkowski content
 Outer measure
 Product measure
 Pushforward measure
 Regular measure
 Vector measure
 Valuation (measure theory)
 Volume form

Notes

Bibliography

 Robert G. Bartle (1995) The Elements of Integration and Lebesgue Measure, Wiley Interscience.
 
 
 
 
  Chapter III.
 R. M. Dudley, 2002. Real Analysis and Probability. Cambridge University Press.
 
 
 Federer, Herbert. Geometric measure theory. Die Grundlehren der mathematischen Wissenschaften, Band 153 Springer-Verlag New York Inc., New York 1969 xiv+676 pp.
  Second printing.
 
 
 R. Duncan Luce and Louis Narens (1987). "measurement, theory of," The New Palgrave: A Dictionary of Economics, v. 3, pp. 428–32.
 
 
 The first edition was published with Part B: Functional Analysis as a single volume: 
 M. E. Munroe, 1953. Introduction to Measure and Integration. Addison Wesley.
 
 
  First printing. Note that there is a later (2017) second printing. Though usually there is little difference between the first and subsequent printings, in this case the second printing not only deletes from page 53 the Exercises 36, 40, 41, and 42 of Chapter 2 but also offers a (slightly, but still substantially) different presentation of part (ii) of Exercise 17.8. (The second printing's presentation of part (ii) of Exercise 17.8 (on the Luther decomposition) agrees with usual presentations, whereas the first printing's presentation provides a fresh perspective.)
 Shilov, G. E., and Gurevich, B. L., 1978. Integral, Measure, and Derivative: A Unified Approach, Richard A. Silverman, trans. Dover Publications. . Emphasizes the Daniell integral.

References

External links

 
 Tutorial: Measure Theory for Dummies